The narrow-billed antwren (Formicivora iheringi) is a species of bird in the family Thamnophilidae. It is endemic to eastern Brazil where it occurs in Bahia and Minas Gerais states. Its natural habitat is deciduous and semi-deciduous forest between 250 and 1,050 metres above sea level. It is threatened by habitat loss. The narrow-billed antwren is sometimes put in the monotypic genus Neorhopias.

Description
The narrow-billed antwren exhibits sexual dimorphism. The male is dark grey, with a black breast. It has 2 white wing bars and white tips on the outer tail feathers. The female, however, is olive breasted and with brown wings. It has been noted that these birds also look very similar to the silvery-flanked antwren.

Behavior
The narrow-billed antwren is a tree living bird, and is found in pairs or small mixed flocks. It engages in gleaning behavior while foraging and sometimes uses its tail to scare insects into flight.

References

Ridgely, Robert S., and Guy Tudor. "Formicivora." Field Guide to the Songbirds of South America: The Passerines. Austin, TX: U of Texas, 2009. 153. Print.

Pictures of these birds can be found in the Internet Bird Collection

narrow-billed antwren
Birds of the Atlantic Forest
Endemic birds of Brazil
narrow-billed antwren
narrow-billed antwren
Taxonomy articles created by Polbot